The northern flying squirrel (Glaucomys sabrinus) is one of three species of the genus Glaucomys, the only flying squirrels found in North America. They are found in coniferous and mixed coniferous forests across much of Canada, from Alaska to Nova Scotia, and south to the mountains of North Carolina and west to Utah in the United States. They are proficient gliders but uncoordinated walkers on the ground. They feed on a variety of plant material as well as tree sap, fungi, insects, carrion, bird eggs and nestlings. They mostly breed once a year in a cavity lined with lichen or other soft material. Except when they have young, they change nests frequently, and in winter a number of individuals may huddle together in a shared nest. Unlike most members of their family, flying squirrels are strictly nocturnal.

Habitat and range
The northern flying squirrel is found in coniferous and mixed coniferous forests across the top of North America, from Alaska to Nova Scotia, south to the mountains of North Carolina and Tennessee and west to Utah. The Humboldt's flying squirrel was formerly considered conspecific, but was found to be a cryptic species, and now considered distinct. It is generally smaller and darker than northern flying squirrel and occurs in British Columbia, northern California, Washington and Oregon.

Two subspecies are found in the southern Appalachians, the Carolina northern flying squirrel, G. s. coloratus, and the West Virginia northern flying squirrel G. s. fuscus, both of which are endangered, although the West Virginia subspecies has recovered enough that it was delisted in August 2008.

The U.S. Fish and Wildlife Service temporarily put the West Virginia northern flying squirrel back under protection on June 6, 2011 in response to a court order.  On appeal, the delisting was reinstated in March 2013.

Description
These nocturnal, arboreal rodents have thick light brown or cinnamon fur on their upper body and greyish fur on the flanks and whitish fur underneath. They have large eyes and a flat tail. They can also be identified by their long whiskers, common to nocturnal mammals. The adult northern flying squirrel measures from 25 to 37 cm long, and their weight can range from 110 to 230 grams.

Gliding

Flying squirrels do not actually fly, they glide using a patagium created by a fold of skin. From atop trees, flying squirrels can initiate glides from a running start or from a stationary position by bringing their limbs under the body, retracting their heads, and then propelling themselves off the tree. It is believed that they use triangulation to estimate the distance of the landing as they often lean out and pivot from side to side before jumping. Once in the air, they form an "X" with their limbs, causing their membrane to stretch into a square-like shape and glide down at angles of 30 to 40 degrees. They maneuver with great efficiency in the air, making 90 degree turns around obstacles if needed. Just before reaching a tree, they raise their flattened tails, which abruptly changes their trajectory upwards, and point all of their limbs forward to create a parachute effect with the membrane to reduce the shock of landing. The limbs absorb the remainder of the impact, and the squirrels immediately run to the other side of the trunk or to the top of the tree to avoid any potential predators. Although graceful in flight, they are very clumsy walkers and if they happen to be on the ground in the presence of danger, they will prefer to hide rather than attempt to escape.

Diet
A major food source for the squirrels are fungi of various species, although they also eat lichens, mushrooms, all mast-crop nuts, tree sap, insects, carrion, bird eggs and nestlings, buds and flowers. The squirrels are able to locate truffles by olfaction, though they also seem to use cues such as the presence of coarse woody debris, indicating a decaying log, and spatial memory of locations where truffles were found in the past.

The northern flying squirrel is also known to cache food for when food supplies are lower. These caches can be in cavities in trees, as well as in the squirrels' nest. Lichens and seeds are commonly cached.

Ecology

The northern flying squirrel also disseminates spores of the fungi that they eat.

Behaviour

Northern flying squirrels generally nest in holes in trees, preferring large-diameter trunks and dead trees, and will also build outside leaf nests called dreys and will also nest underground. Tree cavities created by woodpeckers as suitable nest sites tend to be more abundant in old-growth forests, and so do the squirrels, though harvested forests can be managed in ways that are likely to increase squirrel numbers. Nests may also be established in buildings, including parts of occupied homes. Except when rearing young, the squirrels shift from nest to nest frequently. They often share nests during winter months, forming aggregations. Usually, aggregate nests contain 4 to 10 individuals. The sharing of nests in winter by northern flying squirrels is important in maintaining body temperature (biothermal regulation), as northern flying squirrels do not hibernate, nor do they enter torpor states.

Northern flying squirrels gliding distances tend to be between 5 and 25 metres, though glides of up to 45 m and longer have been observed. Average glides are about 5 m less for females than for males. Glide angle has been measured at 26.8 degrees and glide ratio at 1.98.

Since first documented by Shaw in 1801, the general understanding was that northern flying squirrels bred but once per year. Recently, in southern Ontario, Canada, polyestrous behaviour (two litters per year) has been documented for the first time. This observation has since been confirmed by a second research team in New Brunswick, Canada.

In southern Ontario, Canada, genetic evidence has recently shown hybridization with the rapid northward expansion and increased sympatry of southern flying squirrels.

Predation
Northern flying squirrels, along with pine squirrels, are an important prey species for the spotted owl (Strix occidentalis) and eastern screech owl (Megascops asio). Other predators include various other large birds, especially the great horned owl and hawks, as well as mammals including the American marten, the Canadian lynx,  the red fox.

References

Arbogast, B. S. (1999). Mitochondrial DNA phylogeography of the New World flying squirrels  Glaucomys: implications for Pleistocene biogeography. Journal of Mammalogy, 80, 142–155.
Arbogast, B. S., Browne, R. A., Weigl, P. D. and Kenagy, G. J. (2005). Conservation genetics of endangered flying squirrels from the Appalachian mountains of eastern North America.  Animal Conservation,  8, 123–133.
Bakker, V. J., & Hastings, K. (2002). Den trees used by northern flying squirrels (Glaucomys sabrinus) in southeastern Alaska.  Canadian Journal of Zoology, 80, 1623–1633.
Carey, A. B., Kershner, J., Biswell, B., & De Toledo, L. D. (1999). Ecological scale and forest development: squirrels, dietary fungi, and vascular plants in managed and unmanaged forests.  Wildlife Monographs 5-71.
Carey, A. B., Wilson, T. M., Maguire, C. C., & Biswell, B. L. (1997). Dens of northern flying squirrels in the Pacific northwest.  Journal of Wildlife Management, 61, 684–699.
Cotton, C. L., & Parker, K. L. (2000). Winter activity patterns of northern flying squirrels in sub-boreal forests.  Canadian Journal of Zoology, 78, 1896–1901.
Forsman, E. D., Otto, I. A., Aubuchon, D., Lewis, J. C., Sovereign, S. G., Maurice, K. J., & Kaminski, T. (1994). Reproductive chronology of the northern flying squirrel on the Olympic peninsula, Washington.  Northwest Science, 68, 273–276.
Martin, K. J., & Anthony, R. G. (1999). Movements of northern flying squirrels in different-aged forest stands of western Oregon.  Journal of Wildlife Management, 63, 291–297.
Mitchell, D. (2001). Spring and fall diet of the endangered West Virginia northern flying squirrel (Glaucomys sabrinus fuscus).  American Midland Naturalist, 146, 439–443.
Pyare, S., & Longland, W. S. (2001). Mechanisms of truffle detection by northern flying squirrels.  Canadian Journal of Zoology, 79, 1007–1015.
Pyare, S., Smith, W. P., Nicholls, J. V., & Cook, J. A. (2002). Diets of northern flying squirrels, Glaucomys sabrinus, in southeast Alaska.  Canadian Field-Naturalist, 116, 98-103.
Odom, R.H., W.M. Ford, J.W. Edwards, C.W. Stihler, and J.M. Menzel. 2001. Developing a habitat model for the endangered Virginia northern flying squirrel (Glaucomys sabrinus fuscus) in the Allegheny Mountains of West Virginia. Biological Conservation 99: 245–252.
Vernes, K. (2001). Gliding performance of the northern flying squirrel (Glaucomys sabrinus) in mature mixed forest of eastern Canada.  Journal of Mammalogy, 82, 1026–1033.

External links
Animal Diversity Web - Glaucomys sabrinus

Glaucomys
Squirrel, northern flying
Mammals of Canada
Natural history of the Great Smoky Mountains
Mammals described in 1801
Taxa named by George Shaw